Saray is a town and district of Tekirdağ Province at the European part of Turkey. The population of the town is 24,960 while in the district a total of 47,522 people live as of 2014. The district has cold wet winters and hot dry summers. The district governor is Hüseyin ÖNER , and the mayor is Nazmi ÇOBAN (CHP).

It is neighboured in the north by Vize, in the east by Çatalca, in the south by Kapaklı and in the west by Ergene.

History
Thrace has been settled for a long, long time and relics have been found in Saray from the stone-age and the copper-stone periods (5000 to 3000 BC), but up until the Ottoman period there were only small villages here. Then when the Ottomans established their capital in nearby Edirne, the town began to grow.

In the 18th century when the Crimean Khanate fell to the Russians, the Giray family of the ruling Khans, descendants of Genghis Khan himself, were settled here by the Ottoman sultans. Many members of the dynasty are buried at the yard of Ayas Pasha Mosque in Saray. It was successively part of sanjaks of Vize, Tekfurdağı and Kırkkilise and was a nahiyah (subdivision) of Vize township in Kırkkilise sanjak before 1922.

Saray was occupied by Greek troops for two years during the Turkish War of Independence between 1920 and 1922. Saray became a district in 1922 and bounded to Tekirdağ.

Geography
The land is mostly flat and watered by the River Ergene. At the top north-east corner the land begins to rise to the Strandzha (Yıldız Dağları) range of hills. 50% of the land is farmed, 50% forest and meadow, including the only stands of Austrian Pine (pinus nigra) in Thrace, a protected area.

Saray today
Unlike its neighbours Kapaklı and Ergene, Saray has not industrialised and remains a small town with high schools and other infrastructure, even some nightlife, serving the surrounding countryside. Market day is Wednesdays, and as well as fruit and vegetables, wines from Thrace and from Bulgaria can be found. However, Çorlu and Çerkezköy are only 30 minutes away, and as Saray is a much more green and pleasant environment, some people do commute to work in those industrial areas. The people are liberal and Saray is a stronghold of the centre-left CHP.

There is a military garrison here, and a prison.

Notable natives
The professional football player Fatih Akyel (former Galatasaray player) was from Saray. He left playing football.

Places of interest
The caves of Güneşkaya and Güngörmez - where stone age relics have been uncovered.
Byzantine waterworks - the remains of a system of aqueducts built to take water from the River Ergene all the way to Istanbul.
Ayas Pasha Mosque and Hammam- mosque and Turkish bath built in 1539.
The countryside, especially the hills to the north, leading up to the Black Sea coast are popular places for trekking at weekends.
Çamlıkoy, formerly known as Kastro, is a small village on the Black Sea coast, popular for walking and picnics. There is a forested area of national park here too. There are a small number of holiday homes.

References

External links
Municipality official website 
Governorate official website

Districts of Tekirdağ Province
Populated places in Tekirdağ Province